is a railway station located in the city of Matsudo, Chiba Prefecture, Japan, operated by the private railway operator Shin-Keisei Electric Railway.

Lines
Kamihongō Station is served by the Shin-Keisei Line, and is located 1.7 kilometers from the terminus of the line at Matsudo Station.

Station layout 
The station consists of a single island platform, with an elevated station house.

Platforms

History
Kamihongō Station was opened on April 21, 1955.

Passenger statistics
In fiscal 2018, the station was used by an average of 7181 passengers daily.

Surrounding area
Matsudo City Fire Department Central Fire Department
Matsudo City Akira Civic Center
Matsudo City Library Akira Annex
Matsudo City General Hospital School of Nursing
Senshu University Matsudo Junior and Senior High School

See also
 List of railway stations in Japan

References

External links

  Shin Keisei Railway Station information

Railway stations in Japan opened in 1955
Railway stations in Chiba Prefecture
Matsudo